Dirty Dancing: Original Soundtrack from the Vestron Motion Picture is the original soundtrack to the 1987 film Dirty Dancing. It was released on July 18, 1987, by RCA Records. The album went on to sell 32 million copies worldwide and is one of the best-selling albums of all time.
In the United States, the album spent 18 weeks at number one on the Billboard 200 chart and has been certified 14-times Platinum by the Recording Industry Association of America (RIAA). With shipments of at least 3.25 million copies, it is the all-time best-selling album in Germany.

A follow-up album, More Dirty Dancing, was released in March 1988. The album Ultimate Dirty Dancing, released in December 2003, contains every song from the motion picture Dirty Dancing in the order it appears in the film.

Due to the strong resurgence of vinyl record sales, for the film's 30th anniversary in 2017, Dirty Dancing received a vinyl reissue, along with a Blu-Ray remaster with a 5.1 surround soundtrack and previously unreleased material.

Track listing

1987 original edition
"(I've Had) The Time of My Life" (Bill Medley, Jennifer Warnes) – 4:50
"Be My Baby" (The Ronettes) – 2:37
"She's Like the Wind" (Patrick Swayze) – 3:53
"Hungry Eyes" (Eric Carmen) – 4:06
"Stay" (Maurice Williams and the Zodiacs) – 1:34
"Yes" (Merry Clayton) – 3:15
"You Don't Own Me" (The Blow Monkeys) – 2:59
"Hey! Baby" (Bruce Channel) – 2:21
"Overload" (Alfie Zappacosta) – 3:39
"Love Is Strange" (Mickey & Sylvia) – 2:52
"Where Are You Tonight?" (Tom Johnston) – 3:59
"In the Still of the Night" (The Five Satins) – 3:03

20th Anniversary Edition
On October 15, 2007, RCA Records released a 20th anniversary edition of the soundtrack, containing remastered versions of the original album's songs (in order of which they appeared in movie) plus additional tracks, as well as a DVD featuring promotional videos and photo material.

Disc one (CD)
"Be My Baby" (The Ronettes)
"Big Girls Don't Cry" (The Four Seasons)
"Merengue" (Michael Lloyd & Le Disc)
"Trot the Fox" (Michael Lloyd & Le Disc)
"Johnny's Mambo" (Michael Lloyd & Le Disc)
"(I've Had) Time of My Life" [Instrumental Version] (The John Morris Orchestra)
"Where Are You Tonight?" (Tom Johnston)
"Do You Love Me" (The Contours)
"Love Man" (Otis Redding)
"Gazebo Waltz" (Michael Lloyd)
"Stay" (Maurice Williams and the Zodiacs)
"Wipe Out" (The Surfaris)
"Hungry Eyes" (Eric Carmen)
"Overload" (Zappacosta)
"Hey! Baby" (Bruce Channel)
"De Todo Un Poco" (Michael Lloyd & Le Disc)
"Some Kind of Wonderful" (The Drifters)
"These Arms of Mine" (Otis Redding)
"Cry to Me" (Solomon Burke)
"Will You Love Me Tomorrow" (The Shirelles)
"Love Is Strange" (Mickey & Sylvia)
"You Don't Own Me" (The Blow Monkeys)
"Yes" (Merry Clayton)
"In the Still of the Night" (The Five Satins)
"She's Like the Wind" (Patrick Swayze)
"Kellerman's Anthem" (The Emile Bergstein Chorale)
"(I've Had) The Time of My Life" (Bill Medley & Jennifer Warnes)

Disc two (DVD)
"She's Like the Wind" video
"Yes" video
"Hungry Eyes" video
"Do You Love Me" video
"(I've Had) The Time of My Life" video
"(I've Had) The Time of My Life" karaoke version
Photo gallery

Charts

Weekly charts

Year-end chart

Certifications and sales

See also
 List of best-selling albums
 List of best-selling albums in Australia
 List of best-selling albums in France
 List of best-selling albums in Germany
 List of best-selling albums in the United Kingdom
 List of best-selling albums in the United States
 List of diamond-certified albums in Canada

References

1987 soundtrack albums
Drama film soundtracks
Juno Award for International Album of the Year albums
RCA Records soundtracks
Romance film soundtracks
Various artists albums
Albums produced by Michael Lloyd (music producer)